Barrett Martin (born April 14, 1967) is an American record producer, percussionist, writer, and ethnomusicologist from Washington. As a producer he has won one Latin Grammy and has been nominated in two other categories. As an ethnomusicologist he has produced two albums for the Shipibo Shamans in the Peruvian Amazon Rainforest, and one album for the Neets'ai Gwich'in in the Alaskan Arctic.  He is perhaps best known for his work with the alternative rock bands Screaming Trees and Mad Season. He was also a member of Skin Yard, Tuatara, and Walking Papers, and has performed as a session musician for many artists in a wide variety of genres.

Biography 
Martin was born and raised in Olympia, Washington and studied music for two years at Western Washington University before dropping out and moving to Seattle to join that city's late-1980s alternative rock scene. He later earned bachelor's and master's degrees in ethnomusicology from the University of New Mexico graduating Summa Cum Laude

Martin joined Skin Yard in 1990 and played on their fourth and fifth studio albums. While still a member of Skin Yard, Martin was recruited by Screaming Trees and played on their successful 1992 album Sweet Oblivion. He then joined Screaming Trees full-time and remained with that band until it split in 2000. In the meantime, Martin formed the grunge supergroup Mad Season with Mike McCready, Layne Staley, and Baker Saunders; that band released the album Above in 1995, after which the members returned to their full-time bands. Martin formed another supergroup, Tuatara, in 1996 with Peter Buck; Martin produced nine albums with this group until it split in 2014.

Martin was ordained as a Zen monk in 2000, and started the company Sunyata Records & Books (now known as Sunyata Media) in 2001. He began recording as Barrett Martin Group in 2004, and has released ten studio albums under that name. He was appointed adjunct professor of ethnomusicology at Antioch University-Seattle from 2010-2017.

Martin formed the supergroup Walking Papers with Jeff Angell and Duff McKagan in 2012, and played on that band's first two albums. In 2013 he started writing a music and culture blog for The Huffington Post, and frequently writes for Riot Material. Martin won the ASCAP Deems Taylor/Virgil Thomson Award in 2014 for his writing. He formed yet another supergroup, Levee Walkers, with McKagan and McCready in 2016.

In 2016, Martin produced the album Jardim-Pomar by Brazilian musician Nando Reis, which won a Latin Grammy the following year. In 2017, Martin published the book The Singing Earth, recounting his musical experiences in multiple genres and nations. His second book The Way of the Zen Cowboy was published in 2019. In recent years he has produced albums for CeDell Davis (Even The Devil Gets The Blues) and Ayron Jones Joy Harjo (I Pray For My Enemies), Hector Tellez Jr.

Discography

Barrett Martin Group
The Painted Desert – 2004
Earthspeaker – 2006
Zenga – 2009
Atlas – 2011
Artifact – 2012
Transcendence - 2018
Songs of the Firebird - 2019
Indwell - 2019
Stillpoint - 2020

Mad Season
Above – 1995
Above (Deluxe Edition) - 2013

Screaming Trees
Sweet Oblivion – 1992
Dust – 1996
Last Words: The Final Recordings – 2011

Shipibo Shamans

 Woven Songs Of The Amazon - 2006
 Woven Songs Of The Amazon II - 2019

Skin Yard

1000 Smiling Knuckles – 1991
Inside the Eye – 1993
Start at the Top – 2001

Tuatara
Breaking the Ethers – 1997
Trading with the Enemy – 1998
Cinematheque – 2002
The Loading Program – 2003
East of the Sun – 2007
West of the Moon – 2007
The Here and the Gone – 2009
Underworld – 2014
Shamanic Nights: Live in the City – 2016

Walking Papers

Walking Papers – 2012
WP2 – 2018

Others

Thin Men – A Round Hear – 1989
Mike Johnson – Where Am I – 1994
Various Artists – Working Class Hero – 1995
Seaweed – Spanaway – 1995
Mike Johnson – Year of Mondays – 1996
Luna – Pup Tent – 1997
Mark Eitzel – West – 1997
Protein – Ever Since I was a Kid – 1997
Various Artists – Flying Traps – 1997
R.E.M. – Up – 1998
Mark Lanegan – I'll Take Care of You – 1999
Stone Temple Pilots – No. 4 – 1999
Various Artists – More Oar – 1999
Victoria Williams – Water to Drink – 2000
Mark Olson – My Own Jo Ellen – 2000
The Twilight Singers – Twilight as Played by The Twilight Singers – 2000
Nando Reis – Para Quando o Arco-Íris Encontrar o Pote de Ouro – 2000
Queens of the Stone Age – Rated R – 2000
Therapy? – Shameless – 2001
Nando Reis – Infernal – 2001
CeDell Davis – When Lightning Struck the Pine – 2002
Alex Veley – Maconha Baiana – 2003
Nando Reis – A Letra A – 2003
Nero – Confession No. 1 – 2003
Roger Greenway – Wayt – 2004
Jack Endino – Permanent Fatal Error – 2005
Shipibo Shamans – Woven Songs of the Amazon – 2006
Bola Abimbola – Ara Kenge – 2006
Dave Carter – Commitment and Change – 2008
Under The Rose – Under The Rose – 2009
Rusty Willoughby – CoBirds Unite – 2010
Nando Reis e Os Infernais – Sei – 2012
Mark Lanegan – Imitations – 2013
Vaudeville Etiquette – Debutantes & Dealers – 2014
CeDell Davis – Last Man Standing – 2015
CeDell Davis – Even The Devil Gets The Blues – 2016
Buffalo Summer - Second Sun - 2016
Ayron Jones - Audio Paint Job - 2017
Various Artists - The Singing Earth - 2017
Levee Walkers & Ayron Jones - 2017
Walking Papers - WP2 - 2018
Barrett Martin Group - Transcendence - 2018
Shipibo Shamans - Woven Songs Of The Amazon II - 2019
Barrett Martin Group - Songs Of The Firebird - 2019
Barrett Martin Group - Indwell - 2019
Barrett Martin Group - Scattered Diamonds - 2020
Arctic Neets'ai Gwich'in - A Message To The World - 2020
Buffalo Summer - Desolation Blue - 2020
Joy Harjo - I Pray For My Enemies - 2021
Ayron Jones - Child Of The State - 2021
Barrett Martin Group - Stillpoint - 2021
Jack Endino – Set Myself On Fire - 2021

Film soundtracks
Deceiver – 1998
The Best Men – 1999
Lush – 1999
The Fog Ravens – 2003
Ausangate – 2006
Woven Songs of the Amazon – 2006
The Last Bluesman – 2022

References

External links

1967 births
Living people
Musicians from Olympia, Washington
American rock drummers
Grunge musicians
Mad Season (band) members
Screaming Trees members
Singers from Washington (state)
R.E.M. personnel
Western Washington University alumni
The Minus 5 members
Tuatara (band) members
Rumi scholars
20th-century American drummers
American male drummers
Skin Yard members